Laval Liberty High School (LLHS) was an Anglophone senior high school in Laval, Quebec and a part of the Sir Wilfrid Laurier School Board (SWLSB). It was formed in 2005 after Western Laval High School was split into two schools, with lower secondary levels forming Laval Junior High School. On July 1, 2015, it merged with Laurier Senior High School to form Laval Senior Academy.

References

External links
 

High schools in Quebec
Schools in Laval, Quebec
2005 establishments in Quebec
Educational institutions established in 2005
2015 disestablishments in Quebec
Educational institutions disestablished in 2015